Suzanne Marie Adèle Beauclerk, Duchess of St Albans (née Fesq; 4 May 1921 – 12 February 2010), known professionally as Suzanne St Albans, was a British writer and painter.

Early life and family 
Suzanne Marie Adèle Fesq was born on 4 May 1921 in Kuala Lampur, British Malaya. She was of French descent on her mother and father's sides. Her father was Emile William Fesq, the owner of Assam Java Plantation in Selangor. Her mother, Marie Claire, was a member of the Chassériau family. Her paternal great-grandfather was a wine exporter from Bordeaux who settled in Australia in 1848 after marrying a mulatto woman from New Orleans. Her maternal great-grandfather was a rubber planter from Bordeaux who settled in Malaya. She grew up in British Malaya and in Vence, Southern France. She attended boarding school in Paris and in Littlehampton.

World War II 
During the outbreak of World War II the Fesq family were living in the South of France. After the German invasion, the family made their way along with other refugees to Saint-Jean-de-Luz where they were evacuated by HMS Ettrick and brought to England. Once in England she worked as a librarian in Bedfordshire before being taken on by the Psychological Warfare Branch of the Foreign Office. She was first stationed in Algiers. She was transferred to Italy in 1944 where she worked in Naples, Rome, Florence, Bologna, and Venice. In 1945 she was posted at the British Embassy in Vienna, where she was under the command of Lieutenant-Colonel Charles Beauclerk, the future 13th Duke of St Albans.

Painting 
While serving in Rome during World War II, she took painting lessons. Back in England she enrolled at Slade School of Fine Art after being denied entry into Chelsea College of Arts. Her work, mostly oil and watercolour paintings, was exhibited at the Royal Academy in 1963 and in 1965. She and her husband ran the Upper Grosvenor Gallery in Mayfair from 1967 until 1972.

Bibliography 

Le Théâtre en Classe (1966) 

Road to Bordeaux (1976)

Uncertain Wings (1977)

Green Grows the Oil: Desert Oil and Modern Society (1982)

Where Time Stood Still: A Portrait of Oman.(1982) 

Magic of a Mystic: Stories of Padre Pio (1983)

Paradise and Pestilence: Aspects of Provence (1997)

Mango and mimosa :  a memoir of early life. (2000)

Personal life 
She married Charles Beauclerk on 19 March 1947 after he obtained a divorce from his first wife, Nathalie Chatham Walker. Upon her marriage she became the stepmother of Murray Beauclerk, the future 14th Duke of St Albans. On 13 January 1948 she gave birth to their first son, Peter. On 6 February 1949 she gave birth to a second son, James. On 10 February 1950 she gave birth to a third son, John. On 19 July 1951 she gave birth to a daughter, Caroline. On 15 November 1963 she gave birth to a stillborn daughter.

When her husband succeeded to the dukedom in 1964 after the death of his second cousin Osborne Beauclerk, 12th Duke of St Albans, she became the Duchess of St Albans. She served as Vice President of the Soldiers, Sailors, Airmen and Families Association and was a fundraiser for the Red Cross. In 1978 her husband was sued by the Inland Revenue for not paying taxes. They left England and settled at her family's farmhouse in the South of France. She retired to Newbury after her husband's death in 1988, becoming The Dowager Duchess of St Albans as her stepson's wife, Cynthia Theresa Mary Howard, became the new Duchess of St Albans. In her later life she taught lessons in French, Latin, German, and English. She died on 12 February 2010.

References 

1921 births
2010 deaths
20th-century English writers
Beauclerk family
Chassériau family
Burials at Kensal Green Cemetery
British women in World War II
British expatriates in France
English duchesses by marriage
English biographers
English autobiographers
English memoirists
English women writers
English women painters
English people of French descent
People from British Malaya
People from Kuala Lumpur
Alumni of the Slade School of Fine Art